Radio ISA is a French local radio station based at La Tour-du-Pin created in the 1980s and owned by ISA Media Development. Since its creation it is broadcasting only locally in the departments Isère, Savoie and Ain, of which derives the initials of Radio I S A.

Since May 2012, Radio ISA is also broadcasting in and around Grenoble under the name Radio ISA Grenoble.

Broadcast area
Radio ISA:
Bourgoin-Jallieu : 93.9 FM
Pont-de-Beauvoisin : 96.4 FM
Morestel : 94.7 FM

Radio ISA Grenoble:
Grenoble : 100.4 FM
La Mure : 88.3 FM
Voiron : 100.3 FM

See also
 List of radio stations in France, for a full list of French radio stations.
 ISA Media Development, the group owning this station.
 Les Indés Radios, Independent radio stations group in France, of which Radio ISA is member.

External links

Radio stations in France
Radio in France
Radio stations established in 1984
Mass media in Grenoble
1984 establishments in France